Henry II (13 January 1334 – 29 May 1379), called Henry of Trastámara or the Fratricidal (el Fratricida), was the first King of Castile and León from the House of Trastámara. He became king in 1369 by defeating his half-brother Peter the Cruel, after numerous rebellions and battles. As king he was involved in the Fernandine Wars and the Hundred Years' War.

Biography 
Henry was the fourth of ten illegitimate children of King Alfonso XI of Castile and Eleanor de Guzmán, a great-granddaughter of Alfonso IX of León.  He was born a twin to Fadrique Alfonso, Lord of Haro, and was the first boy born to the couple that survived to adulthood.

At birth, he was adopted by Rodrigo Álvarez de las Asturias.  Rodrigo died the following year and Henry inherited his lordship of Noreña.  His father later made him Count of Trastámara and lord over Lemos and Sarria in Galicia, and the towns of Cabrera and Ribera, which constituted a large and important heritage in the northeast of the peninsula.  It made him the head of the new Trastámara dynasty, arising from the main branch of Burgundy-Ivrea.

While Alfonso XI lived, his lover Eleanor gave a great many titles and privileges to their sons.  This caused discontent among many of the noblemen and in particular the queen, Maria of Portugal, and her son, Peter.

They had a chance for revenge when Alfonso XI died unexpectedly from a fever in the siege of Gibraltar in March, 1350. They pushed Eleanor, her sons and their supporters aside, and Henry and his brothers fled and scattered.  They were fearful of what their brother, King Peter, could do to them.  The late king had not even been buried.

Although Eleanor and her sons reached an agreement with Peter to live peacefully in his court, the situation remained unstable.  Henry and his brothers Fadrique, Tello and Sancho staged numerous rebellions against the new king.  Also, to strengthen his position and gain allies, Henry married Juana Manuel, the daughter of Juan Manuel, Prince of Villena, adelantado mayor of Murcia and Lord of Villena, the most prosperous nobleman of the realm.  In 1351, the King took counsel from Juan Alfonso de Alburquerque, María of Portugal's right-hand man.   He became convinced that his father's lover was the instigator of the uprisings, so he ordered Eleanor to be incarcerated and finally executed in Talavera de la Reina.

After that, Henry fled to Portugal.  He was pardoned by Pedro and returned to Castile, then revolted in Asturias in 1352.  He reconciled with his brother, only to rebel against him again in a long, intermittent war, which ended with Henry's flight to France, where he entered the service of John II of France.

Shortly after, Henry and his men spent time in Peter IV of Aragon's army in their war against Castile (1358).  During that conflict, he was defeated and held prisoner in Nájera (1360). He was liberated (with the help of Juan Ramírez de Arellano, among others) and exiled himself to France once more.

Then Peter IV of Aragon attacked Castile again. Henry agreed to help him on condition that he would lend his support to destroying his half-brother.  This became the Castilian Civil War.  The attack combined Henry's Castillian allies, the Aragonese and the French (a company of Bertrand du Guesclin's mercenaries, expelled by Peter of Castile, who had taken refuge in Guyenne).  Henry was proclaimed king in Calahorra (1366).  In return, he had to reward his allies with titles and riches for the help they had provided.  This earned him the nickname el de las mercedes  ("mercedes'' being Spanish for "mercies").

Peter of Castile fled north to Bordeaux, the capital of the English dominions in France, where Edward, the Black Prince held court. Edward agreed to help Peter recover his throne. Despite the fact that the army suffered so badly from dysentery that it is said that one out of every five Englishmen would not return home, on 3 April 1367 an Anglo-Gascon army, led by Edward and his younger brother, John of Gaunt, 1st Duke of Lancaster, met the Castilian forces (supported by French mercenaries under Bertrand du Guesclin). Peter then defeated Henry in the Battle of Nájera, but Henry escaped and returned to France under the protection of Charles V of France. King Peter and Prince Edward parted ways over the funding of the expedition, and the Black Prince returned to Bordeaux, having contracted an illness on this expedition that would ail him until his death in 1376.

They reorganised their army at Peyrepertuse Castle.  Then, with the help of many Castilian rebels and Bertrand du Guesclin's Frenchmen, they defeated Peter at the Battle of Montiel on 14 March 1369.  Henry killed "the Cruel King", now a prisoner, with his own hand.  This definitively won him the Castilian throne and the name of Henry II.

Before being consolidated in his throne and being able to hand on power to his son John, Henry had to defeat Ferdinand I of Portugal.  He embarked on the three Ferdinand Wars.  Ferdinand's main ally in these wars was John of Gaunt, the husband of Peter's daughter Constance.  Henry was allied with Charles V of France. He put the Castilian navy at Charles' disposal and they played a key part in the siege of La Rochelle, and the Battle of La Rochelle where the admiral Ambrosio Boccanegra completely defeated the English side.

Henry recompensed his allies, but he still had to defend his interests in the kingdom of Castile and León.  Consequently, he denied the King of Aragon the territories that he had promised him in the difficult times.

Henry then went to war against Portugal and England in the Hundred Years' War. For most of his reign he had to fight off the attempts of John of Gaunt, a son of Edward III of England, to claim the Castilian throne in right of Constance.  In his domestic policy he started to rebuild the kingdom, sped up the transformation of the royal administration; and held numerous courts.  He also permanently set up the Lordship of Biscay after the death of his brother Tello.  In foreign policy, he favoured France over England.

He died on 29 May 1379 in Santo Domingo de la Calzada.  His son John I of Castile succeeded him on the throne.

Policy regarding Jews 
Henry was as hostile to the Jews as Peter had been friendly. In order to pay Bertrand du Guesclin's mercenaries, he imposed a war contribution of twenty thousand gold doubloons on the already heavily oppressed community of Toledo, and issued an order to take all the Jews of Toledo as prisoners, to give them neither food nor drink, and if they still refused to raise this enormous sum, to sell their property, both movable and immovable, at auction. Nonetheless, he was compelled, owing to his financial straits, to have recourse to Jewish financiers. He made Don Joseph Pichon his chief tax-collector ("contador major"), and appointed several Jews farmers of the taxes.

The demands of the Cortes in Toro (1369) and in Burgos (1374 and 1377) against the Jews harmonized perfectly with Henry's inclinations. He ordered the Jews to wear the humiliating badge, and forbade them to use Christian names. He further ordered that for short loans Christian debtors should repay only two-thirds of the principal. Shortly before his death Henry declared that Jews should no longer be permitted to hold public office.

Henry was potentially the first ruler since the Visigothic King Ergica to implement anti-Jewish policies in the Iberian Peninsula.

Burial 

After Henry's death, his body was transported to Burgos, then to Valladolid, then finally to Toledo where he was buried in Capilla de los Reyes Nuevos de Toledo His remains are still there today.  His grave is in the choir stalls at one side of the church and it is in the Plateresque style.  The box is adorned with the shields of Castille and León, and the lower interior part has three panels decorated with trophies.  There are two cherubs over the panels, holding the cartouche on which the king's epitaph is displayed.  The inscription translates to:

There is a recumbent statue of Henry II on top of the tomb. It is made from polychromed alabaster.  It depicts the king wearing his royal robes, with his sword in his left hand and his girdle decorated with the lions of Castile.  His right hand holds the sceptre, the upper end of which rests on three pillows that support the monarch's head.  The king wears slippers and his feet rest on a recumbent lion.

The king's entrails are buried in the Cathedral of Santo Domingo de la Calzada.

Partners and children 

On 27 July 1350, Henry married Juana Manuel, the daughter of Juan Manuel, Prince of Villena, head of a younger branch of the royal house of Castile. They had three children:

 John I (1358–1390)
 Eleanor (1361–1425), wife of Charles III of Navarre
 Joanna (1372–1376), died young

He had several children outside wedlock, some of which he mentioned in his will dated 29 May 1374:

 Alfonso Enriquez, Count of Gijón and Noreña (1355), a son of Elvira Íñiguez,  Count of Noreña and Gijón. He married Isabel of Portugal, Lady of Viseu.
 Leonor de Castilla, daughter of Leonor Álvarez, from Dueñas, Palencia.
 Juana de Castilla (1367–¿?), daughter of Elvira Íñiguez. Her father mentioned her in his will, and said that if she did not marry Pedro de Aragón then she would inherit Urueña.  Pedro was the Marquis of Villena (1362—Aljubarrota, 1385) and son of Alfonso de Aragón y Foix.
Constanza Enríquez de Castilla.  Her father did not mention her mother's name.  When he wrote the will in 1374, she was engaged to Infante Denis, Lord of Cifuentes (1354–1397).  However she eventually married his brother, Infante John, Duke of Valencia de Campos (1349–1387).  She inherited Alba de Tormes.
 Fernando Enríquez de Castilla (1365–1438).  His father describes him as the son of Beatriz Fernández.
 María de Castilla (1375-c.1393), daughter of Beatriz Fernández.  She married Diego Hurtado de Mendoza (Admiral of Castile), Lord of Mendoza, and Mayordomo mayor of King John II of Castile.
 Fadrique de Castilla (1360–1394), son of Beatriz Ponce de León y Jérica. Named Duke of Benavente by his father, he died in prison in Almodóvar del Río in 1394. He married Leonor Sánchez de Castilla, illegitimate daughter of Sancho Alfonso, 1st Count of Alburquerque.
 Beatriz de Castilla (?-1409), daughter of Beatriz Ponce de León y Jérica and Lady of Niebla.  She married Juan Alonso de Guzmán in 1370 or 1371.  He was Lord of Sanlúcar de Barrameda and the first Count of Niebla.  Later she became a nun in the San Clement Monastery in Seville, where she was buried.
 Enrique de Castilla  (1378–1404), son of the Cordoban Lady Juana de Sousa, daughter of Vasco Alfonso de Sousa, the mayor of Córdoba, with María Gómez Carrillo, the Duchess of Medina Sidonia and Countess of Cabra.  Enrique is buried in the Cathedral of Córdoba.
 Pedro Enríquez de Castilla (?-1366).  He is buried in Segovia Cathedral.
 Isabel Enríquez de Castilla (?-c.1419), daughter of Juana de Cárcamo. She married Gonzalo Núñez de Guzmán, however, this marriage was dissolved by Pope Clemente VII. Later she entered the monastery of Santa Clara la Real de Toledo where she became its abbess and was buried.
 Inés Enríquez de Castilla (?-c.1443), daughter of Juana de Cárcamo, also an abbess of the monastery at Santa Clara la Real de Toledo where she was buried.
 Juana Enríquez de Castilla, daughter de Juana, Lady of Cifuentes and wife of Infante Denis, Lord of Cifuentes (1354–1397), son of Peter I of Portugal and Inês de Castro,  she is buried at Santa María de Guadalupe.

Titles 
By the end of his reign, he bore the titles of the King of Castile, Toledo, León, Galicia, Sevilla, Córdoba, Murcia, Jaén, the Algarve and Lord of Molina.

Notes

References

Bibliography 
 
 
 
  (critical edition and notes by Germán Orduna; a preliminary study by Germán Orduna and José Luis Moure)
 

1334 births
1379 deaths
14th-century Castilian monarchs
House of Trastámara
People from Seville
Illegitimate children of Spanish monarchs